Lula: The Sexy Empire (also known as Wet: The Sexy Empire) is a business simulation game for Windows and AmigaOS.  The game revolves around building a multimillion-dollar pornography and erotica industry. Character designs were done by German comic artist Carsten Wieland.

See also
Lula games

References

External links
GameFAQs

1998 video games
Amiga games
Business simulation games
Erotic video games
Europe-exclusive video games
Nevada in fiction
Video games developed in Germany
Video games featuring female protagonists
Windows games
Take-Two Interactive games
Single-player video games
CDV Software Entertainment games